The 2000 Carlisle City Council election took place on 4 May 2000 to elect members of Carlisle District Council in Cumbria, England. One third of the council was up for election and the Conservative Party stayed in overall control of the council.

After the election, the composition of the council was:
Conservative 30
Labour 14
Liberal Democrats 6
Independent 2

Election result

By-elections between 2000 and 2002

References

2000 English local elections
2000
2000s in Cumbria